Charles Roux (born 1920, died c. 2000) was a French marine biologist who was the research director at the Centre oceanographique de Pointe-Noire in the French Congo and in 1987 became a professor and deputy director at the Muséum national d'histoire naturelle in Paris. He attained his doctorate award in 1982 and was the author of a number of papers and books, notably co-writing Ocean Dwellers (Nature's hidden world) with Yves Verbreek. He was one of the six founders of the Société Française d’Ichtyologie in 1976, along with Marie-Louise Bauchot, Jacques Daget, Jean-Claude Hureau, Théodore Monod and Yves Plessis.

Legacy
The following species have a specific name which honours Roux:

 Enteromius rouxi (Daget 1961)
 Sardinella rouxi Poll,  1953

References

French ichthyologists
1920 births

2000 deaths
Year of death uncertain